Acățari  is a commune in Mureș County, Transylvania, Romania composed of nine villages:
Acățari / Ákosfalva
Corbești / Székelycsóka
Găiești / Göcs
Gruișor / Kisgörgény
Murgești / Nyárádszentbenedek
Roteni / Harasztkerék
Stejeriș / Cserefalva
Suveica / Szövérd
Vălenii / Székelyvaja

Demographics

The commune has an absolute Székely Hungarian majority. According to the 2011 census it has a population of 4,781, of which 85.84% are Hungarian, 10.19% are Roma, and 1.92% are Romanians.

See also 
 List of Hungarian exonyms (Mureș County)

References

Communes in Mureș County
Localities in Transylvania